Faktisk.no ("Actually.no") is a Norwegian fact-checking website produced through a cooperation between the major media companies of Norway, including the state broadcasting company NRK, the media conglomerate Schibsted (which owns Verdens Gang and Aftenposten) and the liberal newspaper Dagbladet. It is part of the International Fact-Checking Network. The website was founded in 2017. Its editor-in-chief is Kristoffer Egeberg. In 2018 it announced a partnership with Facebook to fact-check content on the platform.

References

External links
 Official website

Organizations established in 2017
2017 establishments in Norway
Investigative journalism